The 1870–71 Commemorative Medal was a Belgian campaign medal established by royal decree on 20 September 1911 and awarded to all members of the Belgian Army who were mobilized during the period from 15 July 1870 to 5 March 1871 during the Franco-Prussian War.

Award description
The 1870–71 Commemorative Medal was a 32mm in diameter circular bronze medal with raised edges on both sides.  Its obverse bore the escutcheon of the Coat of arms of Belgium under a royal crown.  To the left and right, along the circumference of the medal, the relief inscription "L'UNION FAIT LA FORCE" ("Strength through unity").  The reverse bore a stylised relief capital letter A, the monogram of King Albert I of Belgium over the years 1870–71 also inscribed in relief.

The medal was suspended by a ring through the suspension loop from a 35mm wide silk moiré ribbon divided into seven equal 5mm wide longitudinal stripes, black, light green, red, light green, red, light green and black.

Notable recipients (partial list)
The individuals listed below were awarded the 1870–71 Commemorative Medal:
Lieutenant General Harry Jungbluth
Lieutenant General Sir Antonin de Selliers de Moranville
Lieutenant General Count Gérard-Mathieu Leman
Lieutenant General Georges Guiette
Lieutenant General Albert Lantonnois van Rode
Cavalry Lieutenant General Fernand du Roy de Blicquy
Lieutenant General Baron Théophile Wahis
Lieutenant General Louis Cuvelier
Lieutenant General Baron Albert Donny
Lieutenant General Emile Libbrecht
Cavalry Lieutenant General Count Frédéric van der Stegen de Putte
Cavalry Major General Count Théodore-Louis d’Oultremont
Major General Louis Mory
Lieutenant General Charles-Marie Braconnier
Lieutenant General Firmin Joseph de Bray
Lieutenant General Auguste Alexandre Corneille De Ceuninck
Lieutenant General Constant Joseph Alfred Demarest
Lieutenant General Henri Pierre Lambert George
Lieutenant General Joseph Hellebaut
Lieutenant General Augustin Houbion
Lieutenant General Jacques Eugène Muller
Lieutenant General Paul Timmermans
Lieutenant General Alexandre Cousebandt d’Alkemade
Lieutenant General Count de T’Serclaes de Wommersom
Lieutenant General Henri Louis Laurent Clooten
Cavalry Colonel Baron Raoul Snoy

See also

 Belgium and the Franco-Prussian War
 Franco-Prussian War
 List of Orders, Decorations and Medals of the Kingdom of Belgium

References

Other sources
 Quinot H., 1950, Recueil illustré des décorations belges et congolaises, 4e Edition. (Hasselt)
 Cornet R., 1982, Recueil des dispositions légales et réglementaires régissant les ordres nationaux belges. 2e Ed. N.pl.,  (Brussels)
 Borné A.C., 1985, Distinctions honorifiques de la Belgique, 1830-1985 (Brussels)

External links
Les Ordres Nationaux Belges (In French)
Bibliothèque royale de Belgique (In French)
ARS MORIENDI Notables from Belgian history (In French and Dutch)

Orders, decorations, and medals of Belgium
Military awards and decorations of Belgium
Awards established in 1911
1911 establishments in Belgium
Franco-Prussian War
Campaign medals